SFG may refer to:

Military
Special Forces Group (Belgium)
Special Forces Group (Japan)
Special Forces (United States Army)#Special Forces groups

Science and Technology
Sum-frequency generation in optical physics
Signal-flow graph
Superior frontal gyrus, in the human brain
Systemic functional grammar

Other
San Francisco Giants, a Major League Baseball team
L'Espérance Airport, IATA airport code